Leonard Allen may refer to:
 C. Leonard Allen, dean of Bible at Lipscomb University. 
 A. Leonard Allen (1891–1969), member of the U.S. House of Representatives
 Len Allen (Leonard John Allen, born 1931), British Olympic wrestler